Jerry Wayne Simmons (born June 15, 1954) is a former American football strength and conditioning coach who coached in the NFL for 23 years. His son, Jordon, is currently the assistant head coach and head strength coach at Colorado State.

Early life
Simmons attended Garden City Junior College before attending Fort Hays State. In his senior year at Fort Hays, he was an all-state selection at linebacker as Fort Hays went on to win the conference title.

Personal life
He and his wife Rebecca have 3 children, Joe, Jennifer Jo, and Jordon–the current assistant head coach and head strength coach at Colorado State.
His nephew, Darrin, is the current assistant head coach and special teams coordinator for the Cincinnati Bengals.

Coaching career
Simmons began his coaching career in 1978 as a graduate assistant at his alma mater, Fort Hays, while he worked on his master's degree in physical education. He would eventually go on to coach in the NFL for 23 years before retiring after the 2010 season.

Rice
Simmons designed Rice University's first strength and conditioning facility.

USC
While at USC, Simmons oversaw the operation of the strength and conditioning facility, designed the weight room, and developed a year-round strength and conditioning program for all USC athletes.

Olympics
At the 1984 Summer Olympics in Los Angeles, Simmons was a strength training site director.

References

Sports coaches
American football

American strength and conditioning coaches
Rice Owls football coaches
USC Trojans football coaches
New England Patriots coaches
Cleveland Browns coaches
Baltimore Ravens coaches
Carolina Panthers coaches
Living people
1954 births